Yi Seou (1 March 1633 – 14 October 1709), also spelled as Lee Seo-Woo, was a Korean scholar-official of the  Joseon period. An early silhak writer, he was a member of the Southerners political faction.

Works 
 Songpa munjip (송파문집, 松坡文集)
 Gangsa (강사, 康史) 
 Jangsanhuji (장산후지, 萇山後誌) 
 Dongraeseungraseomhuji (동래승람서후지, 東萊勝覽書後誌)

See also 
 Heo Mok
 Yun Hyu
 Yun Seondo
 Yu Hyeongwon
 Seongho Yi Ik

External links 
 Yi Seou:Nate
 Yi Seou
 Yi Seou:Naver
 Yi Seou:Korean historical persons information

1633 births
1709 deaths
17th-century Korean philosophers
17th-century politicians
Joseon scholar-officials
Neo-Confucian scholars